The Museum for East Texas Culture is a museum in Reagan Park in Palestine, Texas.

The building was built in 1915 as Palestine High School.  It opened in 1916 and graduated its first class in 1917.  In 1939 it became a junior high school, and was named the Reagan School, after John H. Reagan, in 1955.  It became an elementary school in 1966 and closed in 1976.  It opened as the current museum in 1982. 
It was added to the National Register of Historic Places as "Palestine High School" in 1986.

See also

National Register of Historic Places listings in Anderson County, Texas
Recorded Texas Historic Landmarks in Anderson County

References

External links

Museums established in 1982
History museums in Texas
Museum for East Texas Culture
Museum for East Texas Culture
Museums in Anderson County, Texas
Sanguinet & Staats buildings
1982 establishments in Texas
National Register of Historic Places in Anderson County, Texas
Recorded Texas Historic Landmarks